Ekaterina Koroleva may refer to:

 Katja Koroleva, American soccer referee
 Ekaterina Koroleva (handballer) (1998–2019), Russian handballer